Grace Margaret Harris (born 18 September 1993) is an Australian cricketer who made her international debut for the Australia women's cricket team in August 2015. An all-rounder, she is a right-handed batter and right-arm off break bowler. She plays for Queensland Fire in the Women's National Cricket League (WNCL) and Brisbane Heat in the Women's Big Bash League (WBBL). Harris's older sister is fellow Brisbane Heat cricketer Laura Harris.

Career
In June 2015, she was named as replacement for Delissa Kimmince in the T20I squad who was unable to recover from a lower back issue and made her T20I debut against the Ireland Women as the part of Australian women's cricket team in England and Ireland in 2015. In December 2015, she made 103 runs from 55 balls, and also took four wickets, for Brisbane Heat against Sydney Sixers, thus drawing much early attention to the first season of the WBBL.

In January 2016, she was named in national squad for WODI and T20I against India Women. Later this month she made her WODI debut against the India Women as the part of Indian women's cricket team in Australia in 2015–16.

In November 2018, she was named in Brisbane Heat's squad for the 2018–19 Women's Big Bash League season. On 19 December 2018, she scored the fastest innings of 100 runs in the WBBL, off 42 balls.

In December 2020, Harris scored two centuries in two days for Western Suburbs in the Queensland Premier Cricket league.

In January 2022, Harris was named in Australia's A squad for their series against England A, with the matches being played alongside the Women's Ashes. Later the same month, she was named in Australia's team for the 2022 Women's Cricket World Cup in New Zealand. In May 2022, Harris was named in Australia's team for the cricket tournament at the 2022 Commonwealth Games in Birmingham, England.

In the inaugural season of the Indian Women's Premier League in 2023, Grace Harris was bought by UP Warriorz.

References

External links

Grace Harris at Cricket Australia

Living people
1993 births
Sportspeople from Ipswich, Queensland
Cricketers from Queensland
Australia women One Day International cricketers
Australia women Twenty20 International cricketers
Brisbane Heat (WBBL) cricketers
Queensland Fire cricketers
Melbourne Renegades (WBBL) cricketers
UP Warriorz cricketers
Cricketers at the 2022 Commonwealth Games
Commonwealth Games gold medallists for Australia
Commonwealth Games medallists in cricket
20th-century Australian women
21st-century Australian women
Medallists at the 2022 Commonwealth Games